In mathematics, summation by parts transforms the summation of products of sequences into other summations, often simplifying the computation or (especially) estimation of certain types of sums. It is also called Abel's lemma or Abel transformation, named after Niels Henrik Abel who introduced it in 1826.

Statement
Then,

Using the forward difference operator , it can be stated more succinctly as

Summation by parts is an analogue to integration by parts:

or to Abel's summation formula:

An alternative statement is

which is analogous to the integration by parts formula for semimartingales.

Although applications almost always deal with convergence of sequences, the statement is purely algebraic and will work in any field.  It will also work when one sequence is in a vector space, and the other is in the relevant field of scalars.

Newton series
The formula is sometimes given in one of these - slightly different - forms

which represent a special case of the more general rule

both result from iterated application of the initial formula. The auxiliary quantities are Newton series:

and 

A particular result is the identity

Here,  is the binomial coefficient.

Method

If we define  then for every   and

Finally 

Similarity with an integration by parts

Beside the boundary conditions, we notice that the first integral contains two multiplied functions, one which is integrated in the final integral ( becomes ) and one which is differentiated ( becomes ).

The process of the Abel transformation is similar, since one of the two initial sequences is summed ( becomes ) and the other one is differenced ( becomes ).

Applications

 It is used to prove Kronecker's lemma, which in turn, is used to prove a version of the strong law of large numbers under variance constraints.
 It may be used to prove Nicomachus's theorem that the sum of the first  cubes equals the square of the sum of the first  positive integers.
 Summation by parts is frequently used to prove Abel's theorem and Dirichlet's test.
 One can also use this technique to prove Abel's test:  If  is a convergent series, and  a bounded monotone sequence, then  converges.

Proof of Abel's test. Summation by parts gives

As  go to zero, so go the first two terms. The remaining sum is bounded by

Using the same proof as above, one can show that if
  (so that the sum  goes to zero as  goes to infinity) 
 
then  converges.

In both cases, the sum of the series satisfies:

Summation-by-parts operators for high order finite difference methods 
A summation-by-parts (SBP) finite difference operator conventionally consists of a centered difference interior scheme and specific boundary stencils that mimics behaviors of the corresponding integration-by-parts formulation. The boundary conditions are usually imposed by the Simultaneous-Approximation-Term (SAT) technique. The combination of SBP-SAT is a powerful framework for boundary treatment. The method is preferred for well-proven stability for long-time simulation, and high order of accuracy.

See also
Convergent series
Divergent series
Integration by parts
Cesàro summation
Abel's theorem
Abel sum formula

References

Bibliography
 

Summability methods
Real analysis
Lemmas in algebra